Margarita Torlopova (born 21 October 1998) is a Kazakh canoeist. She competed in the 2020 Summer Olympics.

Career 
She competed at the 2017 Canoe Sprint World Cup, 2018 Canoe Sprint World Cup, and 2020 ICF Junior & U23 Canoe Sprint World Championships.

References

1998 births
Living people
Kazakhstani female canoeists
Olympic canoeists of Kazakhstan
Canoeists at the 2020 Summer Olympics
Sportspeople from Oskemen
21st-century Kazakhstani women